Julian Wade (born 12 July 1990) is a Dominican professional footballer who plays as a striker for Scottish side Formartine United.

Wade began his football career in 2010, at the age of 19, with amateur club Ideal in Montserrat. After one season in the Montserrat Championship, he made a move to his native Dominica to play for Bath Estate of the Dominica Premier League where he won the league title in 2012–13. In July 2013, Wade signed with professional club Caledonia AIA of the TT Pro League in Trinidad and Tobago.

Wade made his debut for the Montserrat national team during their qualification attempt for the Caribbean Cup in October 2010. However, after being declared ineligible to further represent Montserrat under FIFA's new eligibility rules, Wade made an international switch to represent his native Dominica. He made his debut for Los Pericos during the Windward Islands Tournament in April 2014.

Early life
Wade was born in Roseau, Dominica and attended Dominica Grammar School, where he began his competitive football career. During five years playing for his Grammar School football team, Wade was named the captain and received numerous awards while playing in the Secondary Schools Football Tournament, including being named the most valuable player in four consecutive years. He later continued his education and youth career while attending Dominica State College in Roseau. Wade attributes his early interest in football to his older brother and role model Darlton Bannis.

Club career

Early career
Wade spent his early football career in Montserrat where he vacationed with family members while playing for amateur club Ideal in the Montserrat Championship in 2010. During the season with Ideal, Julian had a series of impressive performances and was named the league's most valuable player for the 2010–11 season. In June 2010, Wade accepted a call-up to represent the Montserrat national team during their qualification attempt for the 2014 FIFA World Cup. Prior to their two-legged series against Belize in Couva, Trinidad and Tobago, Montserrat scheduled an exhibition match against Trinidadian club Joe Public. During the match, Wade recorded a pair goals that drew notice from Caledonia AIA manager Jamaal Shabazz in attendance.

Wade returned to his native Dominica and signed with Bath Estate of the Premier League for the 2011–12 season. On 26 February 2012, Wade scored a vital goal against Harlem United to give Bath Estate an early lead in a match to determine the league championship. However, after Harlem United scored a 75th-minute equaliser, Bath Estate finished as league runners-up following a 1–1 draw.

Caledonia AIA
On 13 July 2013, Wade traveled to Trinidad and Tobago to sign a two-year contract with Caledonia AIA of the TT Pro League. As a result, Wade became the first Dominican to sign a contract to play professional football. On 6 August, he made his debut for the Stallions of Morvant/Laventille during the group stage of the 2013–14 CONCACAF Champions League against Toluca of Liga MX. Wade came on as a second-half substitute and subsequently scored his first professional goal in the 88th minute from five yards out following an Aubrey David cross from the left-flank.

Afterwards, Wade suffered from a series of injuries that kept him out for the first half of the TT Pro League season. However, he returned on 15 November in the TOYOTA Classic to score an 88th minute equalising header from a cross to send the match against Club Sando into a penalty shootout. On 17 January 2014, Wade made his league debut for Caledonia AIA after coming on as an 82nd-minute substitute for Jamal Gay against North East Stars. On 8 April, Julian scored his first league goal for Caledonia AIA in a 5–1 defeat to Central FC in Ato Boldon Stadium. In his following match, Wade scored a further brace to give the Stallions a 3–1 win over San Juan Jabloteh. In his first professional season, Wade recorded three goals in the TT Pro League and five goals in all competitions.

In November 2015 it was confirmed that he would have a trial with Major League Soccer team Sporting Kansas City.

Brechin City
After playing in Guyana and Guadeloupe, and making a return to Bath Estate, Wade moved to Aberdeen in Scotland and signed with Highland League side Brechin City on 11 August 2021, and made his debut on the same day in the Scottish Challenge Cup against Buckie Thistle.  Before signing for Brechin City, he was also on trial with Deveronvale. 

In the second half of the season, Wade scored 5 goals in 4 games, including a hattrick against Nairn County. He departed the club at the end of the season, having scored 13 goals in 33 appearances.

Formartine United
In May 2022, Wade signed for another Highland League side Formartine United.

International career 
Wade has represented Dominica on various levels of international competition, having been capped for the under-17, under-20, under-23 Olympic team, and the Dominica national teams. Wade has also been capped for the Montserrat national team between October 2010 and June 2011.

Youth teams
He began his international career for the Dominica under-17 team during the 2006 CFU Youth Cup. During the competition, Wade made three appearances and scored a pair of goals against Bahamas on 15 August 2006. Earlier that month, Wade also received two caps for the under-20 team during its qualification attempt for the 2007 CONCACAF U-20 Championship. In September 2007, Wade participated in Los Pericos''' unsuccessful qualification attempt for the 2008 Summer Olympics in Beijing. However, in their final group stage match, Julian recorded a brace to give the under-23 team a 2–1 win over Saint Lucia.

In July 2008, Wade made an additional three appearances for the under-20 team in another early exit from qualification for a continental tournament following a draw to Suriname and consecutive losses to Aruba and Saint Kitts and Nevis.

Senior teams
Although he had previously represented his native Dominica as a youth, Wade accepted a call-up to the Montserrat national team while he was playing for Ideal in the Montserrat Championship in 2010. Later that year, Wade made his full international debut for Montserrat on 6 October 2010, at the age of 20, against Saint Vincent and the Grenadines during its qualification attempt for the 2010 Caribbean Cup. He made a further two appearances for the Emerald Boys in losses to Barbados and Saint Kitts and Nevis, which witnessed Montserrat eliminated from the competition without scoring a goal.

Julian received his fourth cap for Montserrat after making an appearance in the team's first leg loss to Belize during 2014 FIFA World Cup qualification in June 2011. However, Wade was declared ineligible by FIFA to further represent Montserrat under the governing body's new eligibility rules. As a result, Wade decided to make an international switch back to his native Dominica in September 2012.

In April 2014, Wade made his debut for the Dominica national team during the 2014 Windward Islands Tournament held in Roseau. In his third consecutive start as striker, Wade scored his first two international goals in a 5–3 loss to Grenada on 4 May 2014.

Career statistics

ClubAs of 5 June 2022International

International appearances

International goalsScores and results list Dominica's goal tally first.''

Honours

Club
 Bath Road Ambassadors
 Dominica All Island League 2006–07

 Bath Road Ambassadors
 Dominica Division One League 2007–08

 Bath Estate
 Dominica Premier League (1): 2012–13

Individual

Awards
 Most Goals Stag Elite League: 2015–16 Guyana Elite League
 Most Valuable Player (1): 2010–11 Montserrat Championship
 Most Outstanding Striker: 2007–08 Dominica Division One League
 Most Goals: 2006–07 Dominica Division One League
 Most Valuable Player: 2005–06 Dominica Division One League
 Most Outstanding Striker: 2004–05 Dominica All Island League
 Most Improved Player: 2004–05 Dominica Football Association
 Rookie of the year: 2004–05 Dominica Football Association

References

External links
 Julian Wade at TTProLeague.com
 
 

1990 births
Living people
Association football forwards
Dominica footballers
Dominica international footballers
Montserratian footballers
Montserrat international footballers
Ideal SC players
Bath Estate FC players
TT Pro League players
Morvant Caledonia United players
Dual internationalists (football)
Dominica under-20 international footballers
Dominica youth international footballers
Expatriate footballers in Scotland
Brechin City F.C. players
Dominica expatriate footballers